The Codex en Cruz is a pictorial Aztec codex consisting of a single piece of amatl paper. It records historical events, such as the succession of rulers, wars, and famines, of the 15th and 16th centuries. The codex centers on the city of Texcoco, but also includes information pertaining to Tenochtitlan, Tepetlaoztoc and Chiautla.

It is currently held by the Bibliothèque Nationale in Paris.

References

Cruz
16th-century illuminated manuscripts
Texcoco (altepetl)
Bibliothèque nationale de France collections